Little Gasparilla Island is a barrier island in southwest Florida, in Charlotte County. It is just north of Gasparilla Island, separated by Gasparilla Pass.  It lies west of the town of Placida, separated by Placida Harbor. It is connected with Don Pedro Island to the north by a thin strip of beach and mangrove swamp.  It borders the Gulf of Mexico to the west. Little Gasparilla Island can be reached by water taxi from Placida.

External links

Little Gasparilla Island Advisory Committee
Little Gasparilla Property Owners' Association

Gulf Coast barrier islands of Florida
Beaches of Florida
Islands of Charlotte County, Florida
Beaches of Charlotte County, Florida
Islands of Florida